Mike Fahn (born December 16, 1960) is an American jazz trombonist.

Background
Fahn was born and raised in Huntington, New York. His father played drums with Lionel Hampton and he started on drums himself. Mike played trumpet, baritone, then at age 12 was playing valve trombone. He later added slide trombone. His sister Melissa is an actress and singer. His brothers, Tom Fahn and Jonathan Fahn, are voice and stage actors. He has toured with Maynard Ferguson, Steve Torme, Ben Vereen and Leslie Uggams, Deodato, and Frank Gambale.

Discography

As leader
Steppin' Out (Cexton, 1989) 
Close Your Eyes...and Listen  (Sparky 1 Productions, 2002)

As sideman
With Dick Berk
One by One (Reservoir, 1995)
Bouncin' with Burke (Reservoir, 1990)
Music of Rodgers & Hart (Trend Records, 1988)
More Birds Less Feathers (Discovery, 1986)

With Bob Cooper
Tenor Sax Jazz Impressions (Trend Records/Discovery, 1979)
Play the Music of Michel LeGrand (Musicraft, 1980)

With Jerry Vivino
Walkin' with the Wazmo (Zoho, 2006)

With Frank Strazzeri
Moon & Sand (Discovery, 1993)

With Andy Simpkins
Comin' at Ya (MAMA Records,1990)

With Andrew Hill
A Beautiful Day (Palmetto, 2002)

With Tom Harrell
Time's Mirror (RCA Victor, 1999)

With Chita Rivera
And Now I Swing (Yellow Sound, 2009)

References

1960 births
Living people
American jazz trombonists
Male trombonists
21st-century trombonists
21st-century American male musicians
American male jazz musicians